Stroboceras is an extinct genus of nautiloids named by Hyatt in 1884 that's included in the nautilid family Trigonoceratidae; the group that have rise to the Nautilidae which includes the living Nautilus.

Stroboceras is characterized by a loosely coiled evolute shell bearing prominent longitudinal ridges and grooves; with a variable cross section, generally higher than wide, flanks convergent on the venter, and a subcentral siphuncle.

References

 Barnard , 1957. Nautiloidea-Nautilida. Treatise on Invertebrate Paleontology, Part K. Geol. Soc. of America and Univ. Kansas  Press. 
 Sepkoski's cephalopd genera

Prehistoric nautiloid genera